Chief Luqman Oyebisi Ilaka (born 21 December 1961) is a Nigerian politician, businessman, legal and taxation consultant and philanthropist. He was appointed the Chief of Staff under the administration of Governor Seyi Makinde of Oyo State from 2019 to 2021. He is a member of the People's Democratic Party (PDP).

Early life and education 

Luqman Oyebisi Ilaka was born to the family of Late Chief Lasisi Oyedokun Ilaka and Chief Mrs Ilaka of Ilaka compound, Apinni, Oyo Town, Oyo State. He attended Grange School, Ikeja, Lagos for his primary education and Government College, Ibadan (1973–1977) for his secondary school. He took his Advanced level exams at Ansar-Ud-deen College, Ikeja, Lagos in 1978.

Chief Oyebisi Ilaka was admitted to Obafemi Awolowo University, Ile-Ife in 1978. He subsequently enrolled at the University of London and obtained a Bachelor of Laws Degree with Honours LLB(Hons). He also attended the College of Law, Lancaster Gate, London in 1990. In 1993, he passed the examination of the Chartered Institute of Taxation of England and Wales and became an Associate member. He is a fellow of the Charterd Institute of Insurance, he also qualified as a Mortgage Advance Planner of the same institute

Political career 

Chief Oyebisi Ilaka joined Senator Rashidi Ladoja at the inception of Accord (Nigeria) Party just three months before the 2011 election and contested as senator to represent Oyo Central Senatorial District where he emerged the first runner up, an election which was won by the now defunct Action Congress of Nigeria (ACN) candidate, Senator Ayoade Ademola Adeseun.

Ilaka also contested in the 2015 election for the same Oyo Central Senatorial District on the platform of the Accord (Nigeria) party with 84,675 votes but lost to Senator Monsurat Sunmonu of the All Progressive Congress (APC) who won with 105,378 votes.

Chief Luqman Ilaka was the senatorial candidate of the People's Democratic Party, PDP in the 2019 National Assembly election which was won by Senator Teslim Folarin of the All Progressives Congress (APC). Senator Teslim scored 91,080 votes to defeat Chief Oyebisi Ilaka who secured 83,600 votes.

In 2019, the Executive Governor of Oyo State, Engineer Seyi Makinde made his first appointment in office by appointing Chief Oyebisi Ilaka as his Chief of Staff. His appointment as the Chief of Staff to the Governor of Oyo State was the first executive action of Governor Seyi Makinde.

He was a member of the Board of Directors for the Nigeria Deposit Insurance Corporation (NDIC) from 2009 till 2015.

Professional career 

Between 1994 and 1997, he worked for Guardian Royal Exchange Assurance, a large British insurance company where he served as a Tax/Financial Consultant dealing with life assurance, investments, inheritance tax and mortgage cases.

He worked as a partner in Salfiti and Co Solicitors based in London particularly, land, trust and commercial cases. He was later engaged as an associate partner in the Jacob Rothschild Partnership.

Traditional title 
He was conferred with the prestigious title of ‘Ladilu of Oyo Kingdom’ by His Royal Highness, Oba Lamidi Adeyemi III, Alaafin of Oyo in 2006.

References 

Nigerian businesspeople
Nigerian politicians
1961 births
Living people